Sunnyside Christian High School is a Christian high school in Sunnyside, Washington.

References

External links
Sunnyside Christian H.S.

Private high schools in Washington (state)